Brunia testacea is a moth of the family Erebidae. It was described by Rothschild in 1912. It is found on the Solomon Islands.

References

Lithosiina
Moths described in 1912